

Ian Bayley is a British quiz player who has won several medals in quizzing, both in singles and as a member of a team. He won the European Championships three times straight from 2007 to 2009 with "Broken Hearts" (featuring Olav Bjortomt, David Stainer and Mark Grant), and in 2004 with the English national team. With his partner Pat Gibson he also won the European pair championships in 2005 and the IQA British Quiz Championship in 2006. In individual competitions he won the British Championship in 2001 to take the Mark Bytheway trophy.

In addition, he has represented the University of Oxford in the Intercollegiate Championship Tournament run by National Academic Quiz Tournaments.

In 2008, with Stainer and Grant, he won the first series of Only Connect. In 2010 he won the final of the BBC Radio 4 quiz Brain of Britain. In April 2011 he won the BBC quiz Mastermind.

Personal details
Bayley studied computing at Imperial College London and then took a DPhil at Balliol College, Oxford, also in computing. He represented both institutions on University Challenge – Imperial in the 1996–97 series and Balliol in the 2000–01 series.

He is currently a senior lecturer in computer science at Oxford Brookes University having previously lectured in the School of Design, Engineering & Computing at Bournemouth University between 2002 and 2004.

National and international titles (IQA)
He was part of the England side that won the 2004 European Quiz Championships, won the 2005 European Pairs Quiz with Pat Gibson and the Club competition in 2007 to 2009 with his club Broken Hearts (who also play The Quiz League of London). In 2012 he was ranked 14 in the world rankings based on performance since 2009 in both the European and World Quiz Championships.

Mastermind
Bayley took part in the 2008-9 series of Mastermind and got to the final where he scored 28 points, but was beaten into second place by Nancy Dickmann (30 points).  His specialist subjects were Tchaikovsky in the heats, Doctor Who in the 1970s in the semi-finals, and American presidents of the 19th Century in the Grand Final.

He attempted Mastermind again in 2010–11.  Bayley's specialist subjects in the heats and semi-final were The Life and Work of Jean Sibelius and the Romanov Dynasty.  He made it once again to the Grand Final on Friday 15 April 2011, this time beating Peter Reilly to win the title. In the final, he answered specialist subject questions on paintings in the National Gallery.

References

External links 
 

Year of birth missing (living people)
Living people
People educated at Merchant Taylors' Boys' School, Crosby
Alumni of the Department of Computing, Imperial College London
Alumni of Balliol College, Oxford
Academics of Bournemouth University
Academics of Oxford Brookes University
English computer scientists
Formal methods people
Contestants on British game shows
Contestants on University Challenge
IQA team event gold medalists